Nasum (pronounced 'nah-zumm') was a Swedish grindcore band from Örebro, formed in 1992. The band released four studio albums and developed into "one of that country's premier metal acts". They disbanded after the December 2004 tsunami killed the band's frontman, Mieszko Talarczyk.

In 2012, Nasum reunited with Rotten Sound frontman Keijo Niinimaa taking the place of Talarczyk, for a one-off tour to celebrate the band's 20th anniversary.

Biography
Nasum was formed in 1992 by Anders Jakobson (guitar) and Rickard Alriksson (drums/vocals), two former members of the band Necrony. The band's name, Latin for "nose", was taken from the horror film Flesh for Frankenstein. The record label of Necrony offered Nasum a slot on a split 7-inch. After Mieszko Talarczyk joined the band as a guitarist in 1993, the band was featured on Blind World split EP with Agathocles. After several more splits, Nasum released an MCD (mini compact disc) of their own with Poserslaughter Records in 1995.

As the band started touring, Alriksson departed from Nasum. Guitarist Jakobson moved into the drummer's position and Talarczyk handled guitars and vocals. More EPs and splits followed over 1996 and 1997; and in 1998 Nasum released their first full-length album, Inhale/Exhale, on Relapse Records. As the band expanded their audience and touring, they recruited a full-time bassist, Jesper Liveröd (from Burst) in early 1999. The second album, Human 2.0, was released in April 2000 and followed by two years of touring and performing in support of the work, including a stop in Japan.

The third album, Helvete, was released in 2003 and featured Napalm Death's Shane Embury. It was well received and led to even more high-profile appearances, especially on the European festival circuit. At that time, Nasum were joined by second guitarist Urban Skytt and bassist Jon Lindqvist, who replaced the departing member Liveröd. In 2004, Nasum released Shift and continued with touring.

Talarczyk went on vacation to Thailand shortly before the 26 December, 2004 Indian Ocean earthquake and tsunami. His death was officially confirmed on 17 February 2005, and Nasum disbanded. A compilation, Grind Finale, was released in 2006 and a live album featuring a 2004 show from Osaka, Doombringer, was released in early 2008.

In October 2011, Nasum announced a special one-off tour to celebrate the band's 20th anniversary the following year. Filling in for late singer Talarczyk was Rotten Sound frontman Keijo Niinimaa. The band played their final show on October 6, 2012, in Stockholm; a concert film documentary called Nasum: Blasting Shit to Bits – The Final Show chronicling the show was premiered in 2017 and released on DVD in 2020.

Anders Jakobson has since stated that Nasum will never reunite again.

Members

Final lineup
 Mieszko Talarczyk – guitar, vocals (1993–2004; died 2004)
 Anders Jakobson – guitar, vocals (1992–1995), drums, vocals (1995–2005, 2012)
 Jon "Elle" Lindqvist – bass, vocals (2003–2005), guitar, vocals (2012)
 Urban "Ubbe" Skytt – guitar (2003–2005, 2012)

Former members
 Rickard Alriksson – drums, vocals (1993–1995)
 Jesper Liveröd – bass, vocals (1999–2003, 2012)

Touring members
 Keijo Niinimaa – vocals (2012)
 Per Karlsson – drums (1995)

Timeline

Discography 

Studio albums
 Inhale/Exhale (1998)
 Human 2.0 (2000)
 Helvete (2003)
 Shift (2004)

EPs
 Blind World – split w/ Agathocles (7-inch, 1993)
 Grindwork – split w/ Retaliation, Clotted Symmetric Sexual Organ and Vivisection (Mini CD, 1994)
 Industrislaven (12-inch, 1995)
 Smile When You're Dead – split w/ Psycho (7-inch, 1996)
 World in Turmoil (7-inch, 1997)
 The Black Illusions – split w/ Abstain (7-inch, 1998)
 Untitled bonus 7-inch EP that came with the Inhale/Exhale LP (7-inch, 1998)
 The Nasum/Warhate Campaign – split w/ Warhate (7-inch, 1999)
 Split w/ Asterisk (7-inch, Busted Heads Records, 2000)
 Split w/ Skitsystem (7-inch, 2002)

Compilation
 Grind Finale (2006)

Live album
 Doombringer (2008)

Demo
 Domedagen (1994)

Compilation appearances
 Really Fast Vol. 9 (1993)
 Regressive Hostility (1997)
 In Defence of Our Future – A Tribute to Discharge (song "Visions of War") (1997)
 The Bloodbath Is Coming 2×7″ (song "The Bloodbath Is Coming") (1999)
 Requiems of Revulsion: A Tribute to Carcass (song "Tools of the Trade") (2000)
 Polar Grinder (2001)
 Grind Your Mind – A History of Grindcore (2008)

References

External links 
 

Grindcore musical groups
Relapse Records artists
Political music groups
Musical groups established in 1992
Musical groups disestablished in 2005
Heavy metal duos
Musical quartets
Burning Heart Records artists